Dupin is a French surname. Notable people with the surname include:

 André Marie Jean Jacques Dupin (1783–1865), French advocate
 C. Auguste Dupin, a fictional detective
 Charles Dupin (1784–1873), French Catholic mathematician
 Jacques Dupin (1927–2012), French poet
 Louis Ellies Dupin (1657–1719), French ecclesiastical historian
 Amantine Lucile Aurore Dupin  (1804–1876), more commonly known as George Sand, French writer

French-language surnames